Neuso Sigauque (born in Maputo) is a Mozambican judoka who competes in the men's 60 kg category. At the 2012 Summer Olympics, he was defeated in the second round by Tony Lomo.  At the 2014 Commonwealth Games, he reached the bronze medal match, which he lost to Ashley McKenzie.

References

External links
 

Mozambican male judoka

Living people
Olympic judoka of Mozambique
Judoka at the 2012 Summer Olympics
Sportspeople from Maputo
Judoka at the 2014 Commonwealth Games
Year of birth missing (living people)
Commonwealth Games competitors for Mozambique